Bloemhof Commando was a light infantry regiment of the South African Army. It formed part of the South African Army Infantry Formation as well as the South African Territorial Reserve.

History

Origin
The Bloemhof Commando was originally established as a commando of the South African Republic (Transvaal)

During the Anglo Boer War for the ZAR Republic
This unit can trace its heritage to the Second Boer War, in which it fought under Commandant Tollie de Beer. 

The commando had an initial strength of 737, and fought at:
 Fourteen Streams, 
 Magersfontein, 
 Kimberley, 
 in Western Transvaal, 
 Tweebosch, and 
 Carter's Ridge. Together with its neighbouring commandos it was part of the force under Boer General de La Rey.

In 1901, this commando fell under the control of acting Assistant Commandant General Jan Smuts. It was reorganised with the remnants of other commandos after the Battle of Nooitgedacht.

A Commandant Tollie de Beer with the remaining 400 mounted men were instructed to continue to obstruct the Mafekeng line.

With the UDF

World War 1
This commando was part of the South African Invasion of German South West Africa under the 1st Mounted Brigade led by Colonel Brits. A noteworthy engagement was the skirmishes around Husab. 

The commando under Commandant Bezuidenhout was tasked to encircle the Schwarze Truppe.

With the SADF

Border War Operations
Although mainly used for area protection in the Western Transvaal, this commando together with Stellaland, Kalahari, Christiana, Schweizer-Reneke and De La Rey Commandos formed a joint operational company that was deployed to the Owamboland region in South West Africa.

The unit resorted under the command of the SADF's Group 20.

At the beginning of 1979, under then commander Cmdt van Rensburg, a group of Bloemhof commando soldiers did border duty in Owamboland within a company of Group 21.

With the SANDF

Disbandment
This unit, along with all other Commando units was disbanded after a decision by South African President Thabo Mbeki to disband all Commando Units. The Commando system was phased out between 2003 and 2008 "because of the role it played in the apartheid era", according to the Minister of Safety and Security Charles Nqakula.

Unit Insignia

Leadership

See also 

 South African Commando System
Commanders after WW1:

1923 - 1930 N Strauss
1930 - 1944 K Moller
1944 - 1948 B Klopper
1948 - 1954 A Pretorius
1955 - 1962 J Jacobs
1962 - 1973 NP Muller
1973 - 1975 Hatting
1975 - 1990 JHJ van Rensburg
1990 - 1996 JD van Zyl
1996 - 2001 AB Muller
2001 -      DJG de Beer

References

Infantry regiments of South Africa
South African Commando Units
Military units and formations of the Second Boer War